Že used to represent the phoneme , is a letter in the Persian alphabet, based on  with two additional diacritic dots.

It is found with this value in other Arabic-derived scripts. It is used in Pashto, Kurdish, other Iranian languages, Uyghur, Ottoman Turkish (j in the modern Turkish alphabet), Azerbaijani and Urdu, but not in Arabic.

In Kashmiri , this letter is called "tse" and represents the phoneme [t͡s].

Character encodings

In other scripts

Devanagari
In Devanagari the letter झ़ (jha with a nuqta or dot) is used to represent the sound of /ʒ/, e.g. टेलिविझ़न ṭēlivižan "television". The letter corresponds to the Urdu Perso-Arabic .

Bengali
In Bengali the sound of /ʒ/ may be represented as জ়়, i.e. the letter Ja with two dots.

Cyrillic
The letter ж, common in some Slavic languages, has an equivalent sound to the "s" in "television" e.g. Zharkov (Russian Cyrillic: Жарков).

See also 
 پ - Pe (Persian)
 ﭺ - Che (Persian)
 ﭪ - Ve (Arabic)
 گ - Gaf (Arabic)

References

Persian letters